Kevaughn Isaacs (born 12 January 1996) is a Jamaican international footballer who plays for Mount Pleasant, as a midfielder.

Career
Isaacs has played club football for Mile Gully, Humble Lions and Mount Pleasant.

He made his international debut for Jamaica in 2018.

References

1996 births
Living people
Jamaican footballers
Jamaica international footballers
Humble Lions F.C. players
Mount Pleasant Football Academy players
National Premier League players
Association football midfielders